The 2004 Outback Bowl featured the Florida Gators and the Iowa Hawkeyes. It was the 18th edition of the Outback Bowl.

Summary
Florida scored early in the game, with quarterback Chris Leak throwing a 70-yard touchdown pass to wide receiver Kelvin Kight to take a 7–0 lead. Iowa equalized following a 3-yard touchdown pass from quarterback Nathan Chandler to wide receiver Maurice Brown, knotting the score, 7–7.

Early in the second quarter, kicker Nate Kaeding made a 47-yard field goal, to give Iowa a 10–7 lead. Chandler later rushed 5 yards for a touchdown to extend the Hawkeyes' lead to 17–7. Before halftime, Kaeding connected on a 32-yard field goal to increase the lead to 20–7.

Early in the third quarter, Matt Melloy recovered a blocked punt in the end zone for an Iowa touchdown and a 27–7 lead. Florida kicked a 48-yard field goal to pull within 27–10. A Fred Russell touchdown run pushed Iowa's lead to 34–10. Kaeding later connected on his third field goal, this one from 38 yards, increasing the lead to 37–10. Chris Leak's 25-yard touchdown pass to Dallas Baker made the final margin 37–17.

References

External links
 http://www.usatoday.com/sports/scores104/104001/20040101NCAAFFLORIDA---0nr.htm

ReliaQuest Bowl
Outback Bowl
Outback Bowl
21st century in Tampa, Florida
Florida Gators football bowl games
Iowa Hawkeyes football bowl games
January 2004 sports events in the United States